Shen Jie is a minor character featured within the famed classic Chinese novel Investiture of the Gods.

Shen Jie is the owner of a certain inn that neighbors Phoenix City, the homeland of Ji Chang. For over five generations Shen Jie has supported this inn. Once Ji Chang had entered this small inn and asked for food, Shen Jie would realize his position and feed him to his heart's content. In an act of kindness, Shen Jie would escort Ji Chang back to his homeland on horse, while Ji Chang would use a donkey. Following Ji Chang's return, Shen Jie would continue to support him to his greatest extent, and would enjoy great feasting with Ji Chang's fellow people.

Following this point, Shen Jie would head back to his old inn with his son, Ho, and continue to enjoy the ways of simplicity.

References
 Investiture of the Gods chapter 22 pages 243 - 245

Investiture of the Gods characters